Galatasaray High School, established in Istanbul in 1481, is the oldest high school in Turkey.  It is also the second-oldest Turkish educational institution after Istanbul University, which was established in 1453. The name Galatasaray means Galata Palace, as the school is located at the far end of Galata, the medieval Genoese enclave above the Golden Horn in what is now the district of Beyoğlu.

A highly selective school, Galatasaray High School is often compared to the likes of Eton College in England and Lycée Louis-le-Grand in France. Since it is now an Anatolian High School, access to the school is open to any student who achieves a high enough score in nationwide entrance exams; the intake, therefore, consists of the top-scoring 0.03% of students from across the country. Drawing on a blend of the Turkish and French school curricula, Galatasaray High School provides education in both languages.

The association football club Galatasaray S.K. was formed by and named after the institution (in the club's formative years the footballers consisted entirely of students from the school). Galatasaray High School is the progenitor of the Galatasaray Community, which includes the football club, its parent Galatasaray Sports Club, and Galatasaray University.

The High School has served as the alma mater of a string of famous figures in the worlds of art, writing and politics

History

Origins (1481–1830) 

Bayezid II (1447–1512) founded the Galata Sarayı Enderun-u Hümayunu (Galata Palace Imperial School).in 1481. The sultan often roamed the city, disguised as an ordinary citizen and legend has it that on one of these rambles he found a garden in Galata filled with beautiful red and yellow roses. In this garden, he met Gül Baba (Father Rose) of the Bektashi Order. The Sultan asked the wise man about how to improve the Empire and the city as they filled with immigrants. Gül Baba explained that he was happy with the city, his rose garden and the reign of the Sultan, but he would be even happier if there was a school which would educate students from this diverse range of backgrounds, as this would train the wise men needed to serve such a large Empire. He told the Sultan he would be proud to serve as a teacher in this school in order to create a generation of valuable subjects for the Empire. Bayezid II took Gül Baba at his word and returned to the garden weeks later with the edict which established the Ottoman Imperial School in the grounds next to the rose garden, with Gül Baba as its headmaster. Gül Baba became the first headmaster of Galatasaray and administered the school for many years. He died during the Ottoman raid on Hungary and his tomb is located in Budapest.

When the Ottoman army went to war, dervishes and minstrels accompanied it to provide prayers and entertainment but also armed themselves and joined in the fighting when necessary. Gül Baba was one of these dervishes.

Interim period (1830–1868) 
Galata Palace Imperial School remained open until the 1830s, when the  Tanzimat movement for reform and reorganisation drastically altered the Ottoman Empire's old establishment. Sultan Mahmud II (1808–1839) replaced the Imperial School with the Ottoman Medical School, staffed largely by French professors with most courses taught in French. The Medical School was based in the Galatasaray (Galata Palace) buildings for some thirty years.

Modern period (1868–1923) 
Sultan Abdülaziz (1861–1876) was the first Ottoman sultan to travel to Europe and, while in France, was impressed by the French educational system. On his return to Constantinople, he announced the Edict on Public Education which established a free compulsory education system for children under twelve. In September 1868, the Lycée Impérial Ottoman de Galata-Sérai" (Turkish: Galatasaray Mekteb-i Sultanisi) was established based on the lycée model. French was the main language of instruction, and many teachers were European. The students included members of all the religious and ethnic communities of the Ottoman Empire. 

From 1868 to 1878, most of the students non Muslims. Many of them were Bulgarian.

Since this period, the district where the school stands has been known as Galatasaray. In 1905, the Galatasaray Sports Club was founded by Ali Sami Yen and his friends in one of the school's classrooms (Literature 5B).

In 1907 a fire broke out in the school and burnt its wooden buildings to the ground. The library, museum and archive were all lost; only some stones of the external walls survived. The school was briefly relocated to Beylerbeyi but in 1909 the students were able to return to a new stone building on the site.

Establishment of the Republic of Turkey to Integrated Education System (1923–1992) 
With the abolition of the Ottoman Empire and the proclamation of the Republic of Turkey in 1923, the school's name was changed to Galatasaray Lisesi (Galatasaray High School or Lycée de Galatasaray). Instruction was conducted in Turkish and French, and the school was composed of an Elementary School (five years) and a Lycée (seven years) where French Language and Literature, Philosophy, Mathematics, Physics, Chemistry, English and German were taught selectively in the last four years.

The school became co-educational in 1965, and female students now constitute at least 40% of the school's pupils.

One of the main buildings of the Feriye Palace on the Bosphorus, in the Ortaköy district, was given to the school when it needed to expand.

Atatürk, the founder of modern Turkey, visited Galatasaray three times: on December 2, 1930; January 28, 1932; and July 1, 1933.

Integrated Education System (1992–present) 

In the 1990s, Galatasaray High School entered another period of transformation. The signing of the Turkish-French Bilateral Agreement of 1992 led to the foundation of Galatasaray University which essentially grew out of the Lycée. With the addition of a new primary education school, the three units emerged as autonomous components of an integrated education system under the aegis of the University.

Admission to the High School (or Lycée) is by selective examinations and about one hundred children a year are admitted. Many graduates of the High School continue their education at Galatasaray University, where 25 percent of the enrolment quota is reserved for them.

Until 1997, the High School provided eight years of education. After children had completed the five-year compulsory primary school course, they undertook two years of preparatory, three years of junior high, and three years of senior high school education. In the 2003–2004 academic year Galatasaray High School became a five-year senior high school, with the introduction of the eight-year compulsory primary education system in Turkey, including one year of preparation.

Galatasaray has a diverse student body, with students coming from every part of the country. The current curriculum consists of a blend of Turkish and French curricula, plus a number of additional language courses and elective subjects. Courses on Turkish literature, geography, history, ethics, and art are taught in Turkish, while French Literature, philosophy, sociology, mathematics, and science courses use French as the language of instruction. In addition, English is taught in the primary school from the sixth grade, while Italian and Latin are taught in the high school. There is also some exposure to Ottoman Turkish, Persian, and Arabic through literature and religion classes, as well as Greek through French classes. 

The students set up an English Club in 1997, which regularly participates in the Harvard Model United Nations Conferences and the European Youth Parliament's International Sessions and other events throughout the year.

The Lycée de Galatasaray diploma is equivalent to the French Baccalaureate, and graduates of Galatasaray are admitted to universities in France without further examinations.

Education 
The school years break down as follows:

French Prep (one year)

Lyceum (four years) — admission through the Secondary Education Institutions Entrance Exam (LGS)

University (four years) — admission through the National University Entrance Exam (YKS)

In 2003, an eight-year primary school system (which integrated the previous five years of elementary school and three years of junior high under a single body) was introduced. Under this new system, the one year prep and four-year junior high education were transitioned into the primary school.

Galatasaray sports

Galatasaray extracurricular activities 

 GSL Biology Club
 GSL Soccer (Both Men's and Women's)
 GSL Mathematics Club
 GSL Rugby Club
 GSL Music and Polyphonic Choir Club
 GSL Intelligence Games Club
 GSL Press Club
 GSL Culture and Literature Club
 GSL Theatre Club
 GSL Arts Club
 GSL Social Sciences Society
 GSL Folklore Club
 GSL French Club
 GSL Travel Club
 GSL Gastronomy Club
 GSL Sports Club
 GSL Science & Technology Club
 GSL Sport Management & Analysis Club
 GSL Photography Club
 GSL Tango Club
 GSL Civil Protection Club
 GSL Cinema Club
 GSL Natural Sports Club
 GSL Philosophy Club
 GSL Permaculture Club
 GSL Animal Welfare and Ecology Club
 GSL Computer Club
 GSL Robotics Club - #9020 FRC Team
 GSL Historical Simulation Club
 GSL Chess Club
 GSL English Club
 GSL Board Games Club

Notable alumni

Grand viziers and prime ministers 
 Suat Hayri Ürgüplü (1903-81), Minister of Customs and Monopoly, Prime Minister
 Prof. Dr. Nihat Erim (1912-1980), Minister of Construction, Prime Minister

Foreign kings, presidents and prime ministers 

 King Zog of Albania (1928–1939)
Yitzhak Ben-Zvi (1884–1963), historian, Labor Zionist leader, and 2nd President of Israel
 Mohammed Ali Bey al-Abed (1867-1939), President of Syria (1932) and Ambassador of Syria to the United States in Washington D.C. (1890 graduate)
 Suphi Bereket (1889-1939), Prime Minister of Syria

Ministers 
 Cihad Baban (1911-84), Minister of Culture and Tourism
 Yusuf Hikmet Bayur (1891-1980), Minister of Education of the Ottoman Empire. Galatsaray teacher in 1912-1920
 Kasım Gülek (1905-1996), Minister of Public Works
 Feridun Cemal Erkin, Minister of Foreign Affairs
 İlhan Evliyaoğlu, Minister of Culture and Tourism
 Orhan Eyüpoğlu (1918-1980), Minister of State
 Turhan Feyzioğlu (1922-1988), Deputy Prime Minister
 Turan Güneş (1922-82), Minister of Foreign Affairs
 Şükrü Kaya (1883-1959), Minister of Agriculture, Interior and Foreign Affairs
 Coşkun Kırca (1927-2005), Minister of Foreign Affairs
 Ahmet Reşit Rey (1870-1955), Minister of the Ottoman Empire between 1912 and 1920
 Fikri Sağlar (1953- -), Minister of Culture
 Mümtaz Soysal 1929-2019), Minister of Foreign Affairs
 Ali Tanrıyar (1914-2017), Minister of Interior
 Hamdullah Suphi Tanrıöver (1885-1966), Minister of Education
 Cemil Topuzlu (1866-1958), Minister of Construction of the Ottoman Empire
 İlter Türkmen (1927-2022), Minister of Foreign Affairs
 Fatin Rüştü Zorlu (1910-61), Minister of Foreign Affairs

Ministers of foreign countries 

 Konstantin Velichkov (1855-1907), Minister of Education of Bulgaria and writer (1874 graduate)

Governors 
 Serasker Mehmet Sait Paşa
 Mar'i Pasha Al Mallah, last Ottoman Interim Governor of the Province of Aleppo, Syria (1876 graduate)

Notable diplomats 
Below are the names of Galatasaray alumni, who represented the Republic of Turkey as ambassadors to the United States, Canada, the United Nations and other countries.

United States:
 Feridun Cemal Erkin (GS. 1920) 1948–1955
 Şükrü Elekdağ (GS. 1943) 1979–1989
 Melih Esenbel 1960, 1967-1974, 1975-1979
 Suat Hayri Ürgüplü (GS. 1924) 1957–1960

Canada:
 Coşkun Kırca (GS. 1945) 1985–1986

United Nations:
 Coşkun Kırca (GS. 1945) 1980–1985
 İlter Türkmen (GS. 1945) 1975–1980 and 1985–1988

Austria:
 Daniş Tunalıgil (GS. 1933) –1975

France

 Necdet Kent: Given the title Righteous among the Nations for saving many Jews in the invaded city of Marseille in World War II.

Famous writers and poets 
 Tevfik Fikret
 Ahmet Haşim
 Nazım Hikmet
 Cahit Sıtkı Tarancı

Other notable alumni 
 Yunus Nadi Abalıoğlu, journalist
 Daron Acemoglu, economist
 Ali Sami Yen, founder of the Galatasaray S.K.
 Engin Ardıç, journalist
 Bülent Arel, composer
 Ünal Aysal, 34th president of Galatasaray S.K.
 Okan Bayülgen, actor and TV show host
 Süreyya Bedir Khan, politician and writer
 Celadet Bedir Khan, politician and writer
 Mehmet Ali Birand, journalist and TV news anchor
 Sadun Boro, first Turkish global circumnavigator
 Jirayr Ohanyan Çakır, President of Turkish Chess Federation
 Çetin Emeç, journalist
 Candan Erçetin, pop musician
 Feza Gürsey, physicist
 Abdi İpekçi, journalist
 Todor Kableshkov, Bulgarian national activist
 Bahadir Kaleagasi, businessman
 Fikret Kızılok, musician
 Faik Konica, Albanian writer, journalist and diplomat
 Barış Manço, musician
 Stoyan Mihaylovski, Bulgarian writer and politician (1872 graduate)
 Nikola Milev, Bulgarian historian
 İlhan Mimaroğlu, composer
 Simeon Radev, eminent Bulgarian diplomat and historian
 Timur Selçuk, musician
 Süreyya Serdengeçti, economist, former Governor of the Central Bank of Turkey
 Ferhan Şensoy, writer, comedian, actor, director, theatre owner
 Turgay Şeren, soccer player, goalkeeper and team captain of Galatasaray S.K. and Turkey
 Haldun Taner, journalist, writer
 Metin Toker, journalist, writer
 İlhan Usmanbaş, composer
 Safveti Ziya, Ottoman writer

Notable former staff 
 Konstantinos Photiadis - Former headmaster, Prince of Samos, and translator of the Mecelle into Greek.

See also 
 Galatasaray University
 Galatasaray Sports Club
 List of the oldest schools in the world
 Education in the Ottoman Empire
 Mustafa Cengiz

References

External links 
 Galatasaray High School

Further reading
 
 History of the school from the official school webpage, for the period between 1481 and 1868. Accessed September 25, 2008 (in Turkish).
 History of the school from the official school webpage, for the period between 1868 and 1923. Accessed September 25, 2008 (in Turkish).
 History of the school from the official school webpage, during the modern Republic of Turkey (including during the Turkish War of Independence. Accessed September 25, 2008 (in Turkish).
 A documentary about the school, served through their official webpage. Accessed September 25, 2008.

 
1480s establishments in the Ottoman Empire
Education in the Ottoman Empire
Educational institutions established in the 15th century
France–Turkey relations
High schools in Istanbul
Beyoğlu
Boarding schools in Turkey